Mahjoub M'jirih (born 1960) is a Moroccan boxer. He competed at the 1984 Summer Olympics and the 1988 Summer Olympics.

References

1960 births
Living people
Moroccan male boxers
Olympic boxers of Morocco
Boxers at the 1984 Summer Olympics
Boxers at the 1988 Summer Olympics
Sportspeople from Marrakesh
Light-flyweight boxers